Abdulaziz Al-Kaabi (Arabic:عبد العزيز الكعبي) (born 12 August 1998) is an Emirati footballer who plays as a left back for Al-Sharjah.

Career

Dubai
Al-Kaabi started his career at Dubai and is a product of the Dubai's youth system.

Shabab Al-Ahli
He was playing with Dubai and after merging Al Ahli, Al-Shabab and Dubai clubs under the name Shabab Al-Ahli Club he was joined to Shabab Al-Ali. On 11 January 2018, Al-Kaabi made his professional debut for Shabab Al-Ahli against Hatta in the Pro League .

Al-Sharjah
On 9 August 2020, he left Shabab Al-Ali and signed with Al-Sharjah.

External links

References

1998 births
Living people
Emirati footballers
Dubai CSC players
Shabab Al-Ahli Club players
Sharjah FC players
Al-Nasr SC (Dubai) players
UAE Pro League players
UAE First Division League players
Association football fullbacks
Place of birth missing (living people)